Baljit Singh Gosal  (Punjabi: ਬਲਜੀਤ ਗੋਸਲ; born May 4, 1960) is a Canadian politician who served as the Conservative Member of Parliament (MP) for the electoral district of Bramalea—Gore—Malton from 2011 until 2015. He served as Minister of State (Sport) in the cabinet of Prime Minister Stephen Harper. Gosal was one of five visible minorities serving in the Harper cabinet. He was defeated by Liberal candidate Ramesh Sangha in the 2015 election.

Early life
Born in India, Gosal immigrated to Canada in 1981 settling in Northern British Columbia. Soon after, he moved to Brampton with his wife, Pawanjit. His formal education includes a Bachelor of Science degree from DAV College Jalander/Punjab University India in 1981 and a Stationary Engineer 4th class Certificate. Gosal began working in the financial sector first in 1984 for McDonnell Douglas Canada and later in 1994 for Prudential Insurance, which later became London Life. He started working in the Property and Casualty Insurance by joining Holman Insurance Brokers Ltd. and then later in 2004 Gosal joined Goodison Insurance and Financial Services and in 2008 he joined Rai Grant insurance brokers where he worked as an Insurance Broker and a Financial Security Advisor.

An active member of the Brampton community, Gosal had been a member of the Peel Regional Police Services Board, Peel Children's Aid Society and on the Brampton Board of Trade Marketing Committee. He also has coached and organized amateur soccer and volunteered at the YMCA. Gosal served as the Treasurer and founding member of the Ontario Federation of Sports and Cultural Organization, and as the Director, past Secretary, and Treasurer of the Ontario Khalsa Darbar Sports and Cultural Centre. He and his wife have three children.

Politics
In the 2003 provincial election, Gosal unsuccessfully ran for the PC party in Etobicoke North.

In the 2006 federal election, Gosal ran unsuccessfully for the Conservatives in Brampton West.

In the 2011 federal election, Gosal defeated long-time Liberal MP Gurbax Singh Malhi and future NDP leader Jagmeet Singh in a close three-way race.

As Minister of State for Sport, Gosal was the Minister responsible for Canada at the 2012 summer Olympics in London and lead the Canadian delegation to the 2014 Sochi winter Olympics. On June 29, 2012, Gosal announced the endorsement of all Canadian provincial ministers responsible for sport of the New Canadian Sport Policy.

According to a social media analysis, Gosal was one of Canada's most active MPs on Twitter.

During the 2015 federal election, one volunteer from Bal Gosal's campaign team were caught on video, destroying campaign signs for opposition candidates, prompting Liberal candidate Ramesh Sangha to file a complaint with Peel Regional Police and Elections Canada. In a written statement, the Gosal campaign stated that it admonished the actions of the videotaped volunteers and had dismissed them from the campaign. Gosal lost re-election.

In 2018, Gosal unsuccessfully ran for Mayor of Brampton.

Electoral record

Municipal

Brampton Centre

Bramalea—Gore—Malton

Source: Elections Canada

Brampton West
=

Etobicoke North

References

External links

Living people
1960 births
Canadian politicians of Indian descent
Canadian Sikhs
Conservative Party of Canada MPs
Indian emigrants to Canada
Members of the 28th Canadian Ministry
Members of the House of Commons of Canada from Ontario
Members of the King's Privy Council for Canada
People from Shaheed Bhagat Singh Nagar district
Politicians from Brampton